Anthraquinone, also called anthracenedione or dioxoanthracene, is an aromatic organic compound with formula . Isomers include various quinone derivatives. The term anthraquinone however refers to the isomer, 9,10-anthraquinone (IUPAC: 9,10-dioxoanthracene) wherein the keto groups are located on the central ring. It is a building block of many dyes and is used in bleaching pulp for papermaking. It is a yellow, highly crystalline solid, poorly soluble in water but soluble in hot organic solvents. It is almost completely insoluble in ethanol near room temperature but 2.25 g will dissolve in 100 g of boiling ethanol. It is found in nature as the rare mineral hoelite.

Synthesis
There are several current industrial methods to produce 9,10-anthraquinone:
 The oxidation of anthracene. Chromium(VI) is the typical oxidant. 
 The Friedel-Crafts reaction of benzene and phthalic anhydride in presence of AlCl3. o-Benzoylbenzoic acid is an intermediate. This reaction is useful for producing substituted anthraquinones.
 The Diels-Alder reaction of naphthoquinone and butadiene followed by oxidative dehydrogenation.
 The acid-catalyzed dimerization of styrene to give a 1,3-diphenylbutene, which then can be transformed to the anthraquinone. This process was pioneered by BASF.

It also arises via the Rickert-Alder reaction, a retro-Diels-Alder reaction.

Reactions
Hydrogenation gives dihydroanthraquinone (anthrahydroquinone). Reduction with copper gives anthrone.  Sulfonation with sulfuric acid gives anthroquinone-1-sulfonic acid, which reacts with sodium chlorate to give 1-chloroanthaquinone.

Applications

Digester additive in papermaking
9,10-Anthraquinone is used as a digester additive in production of paper pulp by alkaline processes, like the kraft, the alkaline sulfite or the Soda-AQ processes. The anthraquinone is a redox catalyst. The reaction mechanism may involve single electron transfer (SET). The anthraquinone oxidizes the reducing end of polysaccharides in the pulp, i.e., cellulose and hemicellulose, and thereby protecting it from alkaline degradation (peeling). The anthraquinone is reduced to 9,10-dihydroxyanthracene which then can react with lignin. The lignin is degraded and becomes more watersoluble and thereby more easy to wash away from the pulp, while the anthraquinone is regenerated. This process gives an increase in yield of pulp, typically 1–3% and a reduction in kappa number.

Use in flow batteries
9,10-Anthraquinone is used as an electrolyte in flow battery which can provide long term electrical storage.

Niche uses
9,10-anthraquinone is used as a bird repellant on seeds, and as a gas generator in satellite balloons. It has also been mixed with lanolin and used as a wool spray to protect sheep flocks against kea attacks in New Zealand.

Other isomers
Several other isomers of anthraquinone are possible, including the 1,2-, 1,4-, and 2,6-anthraquinones. They are of comparatively minor importance. The term is also used in the more general sense of any compound that can be viewed as an anthraquinone with some hydrogen atoms replaced by other atoms or functional groups. These derivatives include substances that are technically useful or play important roles in living beings.

Recently, a class of anthraquinone derivates were shown to have self-healing properties when doped in PMMA matrix.

Safety
Anthraquinone has no recorded , probably because it is so insoluble in water.

In terms of metabolism of substituted anthraquinones, the enzyme encoded by the gene UGT1A8 has glucuronidase activity with many substrates including anthraquinones.

See also
Benzoquinone
Naphthoquinone
Parietin

References

External links
National Pollutant Inventory — Polycyclic Aromatic Hydrocarbon Fact Sheet
Molecules Spontaneously Form Honeycomb Network